Slobodanka Tuvić, married Maksimović, (Serbian Cyrillic: Слободанка Тувић; born September 19, 1977) is a former Serbian professional basketball player. She plays as a Center for the WNBA club Phoenix Mercury. She is a former member of the Serbia national basketball team.

See also 
 List of Serbian WNBA players

External links
Profile at eurobasket.com
Biography - First part
Biography - Second part

1977 births
Living people
Centers (basketball)
Phoenix Mercury players
Serbian expatriate basketball people in France
Serbian expatriate basketball people in Hungary
Serbian expatriate basketball people in Italy
Serbian expatriate basketball people in Poland
Serbian expatriate basketball people in the United States
Serbian women's basketball players
Basketball players from Novi Sad
ŽKK Vojvodina players
ŽKK Vršac players
Women's National Basketball Association players from Serbia